The Hatillo Dam is an earth and rock-filled embankment dam on the Yuna River about  southwest of Cotuí in Sánchez Ramírez Province of the Dominican Republic. The purpose of the dam is to produce hydroelectric power, provide water for irrigation and to control floods. The power station is located at the base of the dam and contains a single 8 MW Francis turbine-generator. Construction on the dam began in August 1977 and it was completed in 1984.

See also

List of dams and reservoirs in Dominican Republic

References

Dams in the Dominican Republic
Hydroelectric power stations in the Dominican Republic
Dams completed in 1984
Energy infrastructure completed in 1984
Sánchez Ramírez Province
Embankment dams